Manfred Osei Kwadwo (born 30 May 1995) is a Ghanaian professional footballer who plays as a midfielder for German club Preußen Münster.

Career
In August 2017, Osei Kwadwo agreed to a contract extension with 1. FC Kaiserslautern until 2020.

He joined SV Waldhof Mannheim in November 2020.

References

External links
 
 

Ghanaian footballers
1995 births
Living people
Footballers from Kumasi
Association football midfielders
1. FC Kaiserslautern players
SG Sonnenhof Großaspach players
1. FC Magdeburg players
SV Waldhof Mannheim players
SC Preußen Münster players
2. Bundesliga players
3. Liga players
Regionalliga players